Michael J. Getto (September 18, 1905 – August 27, 1960) was a professional football coach in the National Football League for the Brooklyn Dodgers in 1942. That season, he coached Brooklyn to a 3–8 record.  Prior to his coaching career, Getto played college football while attending the University of Pittsburgh, where he earned All-American honors in 1928. After graduating from Pitt, Getto remained with the school as a football coach for the freshman team.  He then worked as an assistant football coach from 1929 to 1939 and again in 1947 to 1950 at the University of Kansas. While at Kansas, Getto inspired his hometown of Jeannette, Pennsylvania to adopt the Jayhawk mascot for their high school athletic teams.

References

List of Pitt's First Team All-Americans

1905 births
1960 deaths
All-American college football players
American football tackles
Brooklyn Dodgers (NFL) coaches
Kansas Jayhawks baseball coaches
Kansas Jayhawks football coaches
Pittsburgh Panthers football coaches
Pittsburgh Panthers football players
People from Westmoreland County, Pennsylvania
Players of American football from Pennsylvania